Avonmore is a borough in Westmoreland County, Pennsylvania, United States. The population was 901 at the 2020 census.

Geography
Avonmore is located at  (40.527750, -79.466186).

Demographics

At the 2000 census there were 820 people living in the borough. However, that population has declined considerably in the last 13 years.  The population density was 547.9 people per square mile (211.1/km²). There were 376 housing units at an average density of 251.2 per square mile (96.8/km²).  The racial makeup of the borough was 98.17% White, 1.22% African American, 0.37% Asian, 0.12% from other races, and 0.12% from two or more races. Hispanic or Latino of any race were 0.37%.

Of the 344 households 26.5% had children under the age of 18 living with them, 56.4% were married couples living together, 8.4% had a female householder with no husband present, and 31.7% were non-families. 30.5% of households were one person and 18.0% were one person aged 65 or older. The average household size was 2.35 and the average family size was 2.89.

The age distribution was 21.6% under the age of 18, 5.1% from 18 to 24, 25.2% from 25 to 44, 24.6% from 45 to 64, and 23.4% 65 or older. The median age was 43 years. For every 100 females, there were 83.0 males. For every 100 females age 18 and over, there were 78.6 males.

About 7.7% of families and 9.2% of the population were below the poverty line, including 19.2% of those under age 18 and 6.8% of those age 65 or over

Notable people
 Jill Corey, singer
 Alexis Knapp, actress and singer
 Joanne McComb, baseball player

References

Boroughs in Westmoreland County, Pennsylvania
Populated places established in 1893
1893 establishments in Pennsylvania